Irganai Dam is a hydroelectric dam in the Untskul region of Dagestan, Russia. It is located on the river Avar Koisu.

History
Construction of the dam and power station started in 1979.  The first generation unit of the Irganai hydropower station was launched in 1998.  The second generation unit was launched in 2001.

Technical description
It is filled of gravel with asphalt-concrete diaphragm. The complex includes tunnel spillway, intake structure, two diversion tunnels  each, underground surge tanks, steel-reinforced concrete penstocks, and a powerhouse.

Irganai is the largest derivational hydroelectric power station in Russia, with two radial-axial hydraulic units with a capacity of 200 MW each.
The power station has a total installed capacity of 400 megawatts (MW) and projected capacity of 800 MW.  Its mean annual electric energy output is 1,280 GWh.

The dam creates the Irganai reservoir.

The dam and power station is projected by Lenhydroproject and operated by RusHydro.

Incidents
On 7 September 2010, fire broke out at power station's hall. On 31 January 2011, a stick of dynamite was discovered at the power station.

References

External links

Hydroelectric power stations in Russia
Dams in Russia
Buildings and structures in Dagestan
Dams completed in 1998